"Wide Awake"  is a song by Swedish singer Eric Saade, featuring vocals from Swedish musician Gustaf Norén. The song was released as a digital download on 27 May 2016 through Roxy Recordings as the second single from his extended play Saade (2016).

A Filatov & Karas remix was released on 16 September 2016. The song has charted in Russia and Ukraine.

In 2017, Moneybrother released a cover version of the song as a part of the eight season of Så mycket bättre.

Music video
A video to accompany the release of "Wide Awake" was first released onto YouTube on 26 June 2016 at a total length of three minutes and sixteen seconds.

Track listing

Charts

Release history

References

2016 songs
2016 singles
Eric Saade songs
Songs written by Eric Saade
Roxy Recordings singles